Laredo may refer to:

Places 
 Laredo, Cantabria, the original Spanish town with this name
 Laredo District, La Libertad, Peru

United States and Mexico 
 Laredo–Nuevo Laredo, a bi-national metropolitan area
 Laredo, Texas
 Downtown Laredo
 Laredo International Airport
 Nuevo Laredo, Tamaulipas, Mexico (in Nuevo Laredo Municipality)
 Nuevo Laredo International Airport
 Laredo, Missouri
 Laredo, Montana
 Laredo Ranchettes, Texas
 Laredo, Rocky Boys Indian Reservation, Montana
 Laredo, Michoacán

Canada 
 Laredo Channel, British Columbia
 Laredo Inlet, British Columbia
 Laredo Sound, British Columbia

Sports teams 
 Laredo Heat, a soccer team based in Laredo, Texas, founded in 2004
 Laredo Lemurs, a baseball team based in Laredo, Texas, founded in 2011
 Laredo Rattlesnakes, an indoor football team based in Laredo, Texas, founded in 2011
 Bravos de Nuevo Laredo, a soccer club based in Nuevo Laredo, Tamaulipas, founded in 2004
 SD Laredo, a football team based in Laredo, Cantabria, founded in 1927
 Toros de Nuevo Laredo, a basketball team based in Nuevo Laredo, Tamaulipas, founded in 2007

Defunct teams 
 Laredo Apaches, a baseball team based in Laredo, Texas
 Laredo Broncos, a baseball team based in Laredo, Texas
 Laredo Bucks, an ice hockey team based in Laredo, Texas
 Laredo Law, an arena football team based in Laredo, Texas
 Laredo Lobos, an arena football team based in Laredo, Texas
 Tecolotes de Nuevo Laredo, a baseball team based in Nuevo Laredo, Tamaulipas

Media
Laredo (TV series), a 1965 western series starring Peter Brown
Laredo, a fictional planet colonised by Hispanic people, in the Dread Empire's Fall series by Walter Jon Williams
Laredo (album), a 1990 album by Steve Wariner
"Laredo" (Chris Cagle song), on the 2000 album Play It Loud
"Laredo" (Band of Horses song), a 2010 song by Band of Horses
"Laredo", a song by Babes in Toyland from the 1993 EP Painkillers
"Laredo", a song by Tomahawk from the 2001 album Tomahawk

Vehicles 
 Laredo, a special trim package for the GMC Caballero, 1978–79
 Laredo, a trim package for the Jeep Cherokee (SJ), 1974–1983
 Laredo, a trim package for the Jeep Cherokee (XJ), 1985–1992
 Laredo, a trim package for the Jeep Grand Cherokee, 1993–98 (ZJ), 1999-2004 (WJ), 2005-10 (WK), 2011–2020 (WK2), 2021- (WL)

Other uses 
 Laredo (surname)
 Laredo (cigarette), a tobacco kit from Brown & Williamson

See also 
 Streets of Laredo (disambiguation)